Dante's Inferno is a 1935 American drama horror film starring Spencer Tracy and loosely based on Dante Alighieri's Divine Comedy. The film remains primarily remembered for a 10-minute depiction of hell realised by director Harry Lachman, himself an established post-impressionist painter. This was Fox Film Corporation's last film to be produced under the Fox Studios banner before the company merged with Twentieth Century Pictures to create 20th Century-Fox Film Corporation.

Plot
Jim Carter, a former stoker, takes over a fairground show, run by 'Pop' McWade, which depicts scenes from Dante's Inferno. He marries Pop's niece Betty and they have a son, Alexander. Meanwhile, the show becomes a great success, with Carter making it larger and more lurid. An inspector declares the fair unsafe but Carter bribes him into silence. There is a partial collapse at the fair which injures Pop. Recovering in hospital, he admonishes Carter and we see a lengthy vision of the Inferno. Undeterred, Carter establishes a new venture with an unsafe floating casino, only for disaster to strike again at sea.

Cast
 Spencer Tracy as Jim Carter
 Claire Trevor as Betty McWade
 Henry B. Walthall as Pop McWade
 Alan Dinehart as Jonesy
 Scotty Beckett as Alexander Carter 
 Rita Hayworth (credited as Rita Cansino) as Dancer
 Willard Robertson as Building Inspector Harris
 Morgan Wallace as Chad Williford
 Robert Gleckler as Dean
 Don Ameche as Man in Stoke-Hold (uncredited) 
 Jack Mower as Court Bailiff (uncredited) 
 George Irving as Judge (uncredited)

This was Spencer Tracy's last film for Fox before moving to MGM.

Production

Development
The film uses a conventional story of greed and dishonesty to project an image of the Inferno conjured up in Dante's 14th-century epic poem. Director Lachman had established a substantial reputation as a painter before embarking on a Hollywood career and he summoned his artistic vision to realise Dante's work in cinematographic form, drawing on the engravings of Gustave Doré. The film's reputation pivots on the 10 minute vision of the Inferno and reception has been mixed.  Leslie Halliwell described it as "one of the most unexpected, imaginative and striking pieces of cinema in Hollywood's history," while Variety held that it was, "a pushover for vigorous exploitation."

Release
The 1935 film was produced by Fox Film Corporation just before the May 31, 1935 merger that created Twentieth Century-Fox, and so it was released as a Twentieth Century-Fox film.

References

External links 
 
 
 
 

1935 films
1930s drama films
American horror films
1935 horror films
American black-and-white films
Films based on Inferno (Dante)
Films directed by Harry Lachman
Films set in hell
Fox Film films
American drama films
Films produced by Sol M. Wurtzel
20th Century Fox films
1935 drama films
1930s English-language films
1930s American films